HLA class II histocompatibility antigen, DQ(6) alpha chain is a protein that in humans is encoded by the HLA-DQA2 gene. Also known as HLA-DXA or DAAP-381D23.2, it is part of the human leucocyte antigen system.

The protein encoded by this gene is expressed, but unlike HLA-DQA1, it apparently unable to heterodimerize with HLA class II beta chain paralogues. The low level of HLA-DQA2 expression is apparently due to impaired transcription factor binding to the HLA-DQA2 gene promoter.

References

Further reading